Richard Roll (born October 31, 1939) is an American economist and professor of finance at UCLA, best known for his work on portfolio theory and asset pricing, both theoretical and empirical.

He earned his bachelor's degree in aerospace engineering from Auburn University in 1961, and his M.B.A. in 1963 at the University of Washington while working for Boeing in Seattle, Washington.  In 1968, he received his Ph.D. from the Graduate School of Business at the University of Chicago in economics, finance, and statistics.  His Ph.D. thesis, "The Behavior of Interest Rates: An Application of the Efficient Market Model to U.S. Treasury Bills," won the Irving Fisher Prize as the best American dissertation in economics in 1968.

Roll co-authored the first event study that sought to analyze how stock prices respond to an event in 1969, using price data from the newly available CRSP database. Roll has co-authored major papers with Stephen Ross, Eugene Fama, Michael Jensen and Kenneth French.

Roll took an Assistant Professor position at Carnegie-Mellon University in 1968, a professorship at the European Institute for Advance Studies in Management in 1973, and Centre d'Enseignement Superiéure des Affaires in 1975.  In 1976, Roll joined the faculty at UCLA, where he remains as Japan Alumni Chair Professor of Finance.  In 1987, Roll was elected President of the American Finance Association.  He has published over 80 professional articles.

See also

 Roll's critique

References

External links
 UCLA Page

1939 births
Living people
American economists
Financial economists
Fellows of the Econometric Society
Auburn University alumni
University of Washington Foster School of Business alumni
University of Chicago Booth School of Business alumni
Presidents of the American Finance Association